The 2005 Scottish Cup Final was played on 28 May 2005 at Hampden Park in Glasgow and was the final of the 120th Scottish Cup. The final was contested by Celtic and Dundee United. Celtic won the match with an eleventh-minute goal from Alan Thompson.

Background
Dundee United had had a difficult season and had dismissed manager Ian McCall in March with the club facing being relegated from the Scottish Premier League, appointing his assistant Gordon Chisholm as his replacement, initially on an interim basis. A week before the Scottish Cup final United went into their final league match against Inverness Caledonian Thistle knowing they needed a point to ensure they avoided relegation. Ultimately they avoided this fate, beating Inverness 1–0, while city rivals Dundee lost their match and were relegated.

By contrast Celtic had gone into the final day of the league season as league leaders. With minutes to go Celtic looked set to be champions as they were leading Motherwell 1-0. However two late goals by Motherwell's Scott McDonald led to defeat for Celtic, which meant their arch-rivals Rangers emerged as champions. The final would be the last match in charge of Celtic for manager Martin O'Neill who had announced he would be leaving the club at the end of the season.

Road to the final

Match

Summary
The match was decided after 11 minutes when Alan Thompson scored the only goal of the game from a free-kick which deflected off United defender Garry Kenneth. United had a chance to equalise shortly afterwards when a Jason Scotland cross was narrowly missed by Stevie Crawford. Thereafter Celtic dominated much of the match, but failed to add to their total. Celtic's best chance came when they were awarded a penalty, but Chris Sutton put the spot-kick over the bar. At the very end of the match United's Alan Archibald came close to equalising when his long range strike beat Celtic goalkeeper Rab Douglas, but it rebounded off the crossbar and shortly afterwards the final whistle was blown.

Match details

References

2005
Scottish Cup Final 2005
Scottish Cup Final 2005
Cup Final
2000s in Glasgow
May 2005 sports events in Europe